Clarkes Hill is a town in Saint John Parish, Antigua and Barbuda.

Demographics 
Clarkes Hill has one enumeration district, ED 33800 Clarkes Hill.

References 

Saint John Parish, Antigua and Barbuda
Populated places in Antigua and Barbuda